Yuxisaurus (meaning "Yuxi lizard") is an extinct genus of basal thyreophoran dinosaur from the Early Jurassic (Sinemurian-Toarcian) Fengjiahe Formation of southwestern China. The type species is Yuxisaurus kopchicki.

Discovery and naming 

Yuxisaurus was first named in a bioRxiv preprint released in late 2021, but was not considered valid, due to having not been validly published. The taxon was formally published shortly thereafter, in March 2022. The holotype of the taxon, CVEB 21701, represents a partial skeleton including parts of the skull, several vertebrae, elements of the limbs, and at least 120 osteoderms.

The generic name, "Yuxisaurus," combines a reference to the type locality in Yuxi, Yunnan Province, China, with the Greek "sauros," meaning "lizard." The specific name, "kopchicki," honors the biologist John J. Kopchick.

Classification 
Yuxisaurus was a basal thyreophoran. Depending on the dataset, it may be the sister taxon to the German Emausaurus or more basal than Scelidosaurus and eurypods. The discovery of Yuxisaurus definitively proves that thyreophorans were present in Asia during the Early Jurassic, as other potential records of Early Jurassic Asian thyreophorans, Bienosaurus and Tatisaurus, are too fragmentary to be of any significance.

Topology 1: Norman dataset

Topology 2: Maidment et al. dataset

References 

Thyreophorans
Sinemurian first appearances
Toarcian extinctions
Fossil taxa described in 2022